Vasyl Mykhailovych Chervoniy (17 August 1958 – 4 July 2009) was a Ukrainian chemical engineer, cultural activist and later politician, member of the Verkhovna Rada.

In 1981–1991 he worked at the factory "Rivne Azot". In 1988 Chervoniy was the first who created the Shevchenko Society of Ukrainian Language and in 1989 the first branch of the People's Movement of Ukraine.

In 1990–2005 Chervoniy was a member of the Verkhovna Rada representing People's Movement of Ukraine (since 1999 Ukrainian People's Party). During the ongoing protests Ukraine without Kuchma, he was a member of the National Salvation Committee.

In 2005–2006 he served as a Governor of Rivne Oblast. 

In 2008 Chervoniy ran unsuccessfully for a mayor of Rivne.

In 2009 near a pond in Derazhne village, he was struck by lightning. Chervoniy was taken to the Central Hospital of Rivne Raion in Klevan where he died.

References

External links
 Profile at the Official Ukraine Today portal

1958 births
2009 deaths
People from Rivne Oblast
Kyiv Polytechnic Institute alumni
Governors of Rivne Oblast
First convocation members of the Verkhovna Rada
Second convocation members of the Verkhovna Rada
Third convocation members of the Verkhovna Rada
Fourth convocation members of the Verkhovna Rada
People's Movement of Ukraine politicians
Ukrainian People's Party politicians
Deaths from lightning strikes